The 1808 United States presidential election in Vermont took place between November 4 and December 7, 1808, as part of the 1808 United States presidential election. The state legislature chose six representatives, or electors to the Electoral College, who voted for President and Vice President.

During this election, Vermont cast its six electoral votes to Democratic Republican candidate and Secretary of State James Madison. As the other four New England states cast their electoral votes for Federalist candidate Charles Cotesworth Pinckney, Vermont became the only state in New England to vote for Madison.

See also
 United States presidential elections in Vermont

References

Vermont
1808
1808 Vermont elections